The Grand Lodge of Kansas Ancient Free & Accepted Masons is the governing body that supervise Freemasonry in the U.S. state of Kansas. The Grand Lodge of Kansas is headquartered in Emporia, Kansas.

History
In 1854, three Wyandot Indians and five white settlers – all of whom were Masons – coalesced in what is now Wyandotte County, Kansas, and petitioned the Grand Lodge of Missouri to establish a Lodge of Masons in a Wyandot Indian village. On August 4, 1854, the dispensation was granted and one week later Kansas Lodge U.D. (eventually to become Wyandotte Lodge No. 3) opened for work. Within two years, two other lodges in Kansas were formed and in 1856 the trio formed the Grand Lodge of Kansas as America's Civil War loomed.

Notably, the first master of Kansas Lodge U.D. was John Milton Chivington, a Methodist missionary to the Wyandot and a vocal opponent of slavery. Chivington left Kansas in 1860, became an officer in the Union army and was later celebrated as a hero for his part in the Battle of Glorieta Pass (1862). His orchestration of the Sand Creek Massacre (1864), however, earned him universal condemnation and ultimately made him infamous.

In the early years of the Grand Lodge, they pledged support to the advancement of Freemasonry in Tasmania and New Zealand.

Organization
The Lodge is led by a Grand Master who is elected to serve a one-year term at the annual meeting, held in March of each year. Other officers elected by the membership include Deputy Grand Master, Grand Senior and Junior Wardens, Grand Secretary and Grand Treasurer.

Community and charity
The Grand Lodge sponsors a local Masonic Child Identification Program as well as drug and alcohol awareness programs in schools, and offers scholarships to eligible students. The Kansas Masonic Foundation, a 501(c) organization under the provisions of the United States Internal Revenue Code (26 U.S.C. § 501(c), is the Kansas Freemasons charity. Though operated by a board of trustees of Kansas masons, and separate from the Grand Lodge of Kansas, the Grand Master and his council of administration sit on the board with the grand master having the authority to oversee the foundation.

The Kansas Mason
Established in 1963, The Kansas Mason is the official publication of the 'Grand Lodge of Kansas. It is published quarterly on the 15th of February, May, September and December.

Library and museum
The Grand Lodge houses a sizable collection of material related to Freemasonry in Kansas and throughout the world, dating from the nineteenth century to the present. Among their holdings are Masonic periodicals, proceedings from American and foreign jurisdictions, records and documents from Kansas lodges, and Masonic artifacts such as aprons, gavels, lodge furniture, photographs, pins/badges and ephemera.

References

External links
 

Grand Lodges
Organizations based in Kansas
1856 establishments in Kansas Territory